Beth Wagner Liston (born October 26, 1974) is an American doctor and politician who is the member of the Ohio House of Representatives from the 8th district in Franklin County. Ohio House District 8 includes Dublin, Worthington, and parts of Northwest Columbus. Liston is currently serving her second term as a State Representative.

Early life and education 
Liston was born on Long Island, New York and moved to Columbus at the age of 8. Growing up in Worthington, she attended Linworth Alternative High School as well as Thomas Worthington High School and graduated as Salutatorian in 1992. Liston was awarded the Glenna R Joyce Scholarship which included a full scholarship to study at the University of Notre Dame where she graduated magna cum laude in 1996 with a degree in biochemistry. After graduating from Notre Dame, Liston enrolled in a dual MD/PhD program at Ohio State University. Her PhD research was focused on the molecular biology of cancer chemo-prevention. In 2002, Liston graduated cum laude earning both an MD and PhD. For her accomplishments in medical studies, she was inducted into Alpha Omega Alpha Medical Honor Society. Liston completed her medical residency training at Yale New Haven Hospital between 2002 and 2006 and is currently board certified in both Internal Medicine and Pediatrics.

Beth and her husband Denver Liston live in Dublin with their two children Madeline (16) and Adam (14). She also is a member of the Dublin Worthington Rotary and President Elect of the Columbus Medical Association.

Medical career 
After completing her studies in 2006, Beth Liston joined the faculty at The Ohio State University as an assistant professor in the Department of Internal Medicine, Division of Hospital Medicine. She has since been caring for hospitalized adults and children at both Ohio State Wexner Medical Center and Nationwide Children's Hospital. In 2012, Liston was promoted to associate professor and in 2018 promoted to full professor of clinical medicine based on her research and national reputation for developing curricula in the fields of clinical reasoning and inter-professional collaboration. Liston is one of only a handful of professors in hospital medicine across the nation, and the only of over 100 doctors in her division to achieve this rank.

Political career

Election
Liston was elected in the general election on November 6, 2018, winning 57 percent of the vote over 43 percent for Republican candidate Stu Harris, flipping the seat from Republican control to Democratic control. Liston was re-elected in the general election on November 3, 2020, winning 56.8 percent of the vote over 43.2 percent for Republican candidate Mehek Cooke.

Committees
133rd General Assembly

Liston served on the following committees in the 133rd GA: Health, Economic and Workforce Development, and Aging and Long  Term Care.

134th General Assembly

Liston serves on the following committees in the current GA: Health, Behavioral Health and Recovery Supports, Ways and Means, and serves as the Ranking Minority Member on Families, Aging, and Human Services.

Legislation 
133rd General Assembly

Representative Liston was the Primary Sponsor of 9 bills introduced in the legislature during the 133rd GA; House Bill 61,  House Bill 165,  House Bill 198, House Bill 300,  House Bill 315,  House Bill 379, House Bill 385, House Bill 387, and House Bill 407. Liston was also a cosponsor of over 100 other pieces of legislation.

134th General Assembly

Liston is the Primary Sponsor of 3 bills currently introduced in the legislature; House Bill 41, House Bill 153, and House Bill 212. Liston is also a cosponsor of over 40 other pieces of legislation.

Election history

References

1974 births
Living people
21st-century American politicians
21st-century American women politicians
Liston, Beth
Ohio State University College of Medicine alumni
University of Notre Dame alumni
Women state legislators in Ohio